Kapanadze is one of the most common surnames in Georgia.  According to legend, the first Kapanadze (Son of Kapan) was a hunter of wolves. The Kapanadze family are mostly in Tbilisi, Chiatura, Sachkhere, Kutaisi and Gori.

People with the surname
 Vakhtang Kapanadze

Georgian-language surnames
Patronymic surnames
Surnames of Georgian origin